Henry Peter Reitz (June 29, 1867 – November 10, 1914), nicknamed "Heinie", was an American second baseman in Major League Baseball who played for the Baltimore Orioles, Washington Senators, and Pittsburgh Pirates. He was born in Chicago.

Career
In 1893, Reitz was sold, for $300, by the San Francisco Friscos to the Baltimore Orioles. His five-year tenure at Baltimore included his most notable season, 1894, during which he collected 31 triples. At the time, this tied Dave Orr's mark, set in 1886, for most triples in a single season. Contributing to Reitz's 31 triples in 1894 were two bases loaded triples he hit in the 3rd and 7th inning on June 4 against the Chicago Colts that led Baltimore to a 12–4 victory. Reitz's two bases loaded triples in a single game matched a feat achieved by Sam Thompson in 1887. The frequency with which Reitz hit triples in 1894 was marked departure from every other season in his career. Excluding his record-tying season, he averaged under six triples per year.

On December 10, 1897, he was traded (with Jack Doyle and Doc Amole) to the Washington Senators in exchange for Doc McJames, Gene DeMontreville, and Dan McGann. After one season in Washington, Reitz was traded to the Pittsburgh Pirates in exchange for Dick Padden, Jimmy Slagle, and Jack O'Brien. Reitz played 34 games for Pittsburgh in the 1899 season, and was traded in March 1900, to Milwaukee of the American Association in exchange for a player to be named later. In September 1900, Pittsburgh received Harry Smith to complete the transaction.

Reitz was killed in a car accident at the age of 47 in Sacramento, California. This marked the first time that a car accident claimed the life of a major league baseball player, although it would not be until 1924 that an active major-leaguer, Boston Braves shortstop Tony Boeckel, would die in an auto accident.

See also
 List of Major League Baseball annual triples leaders

References

External links

1867 births
1914 deaths
19th-century baseball players
Baltimore Orioles players
Baseball players from Chicago
Major League Baseball second basemen
Pittsburgh Pirates players
Road incident deaths in California
Washington Senators (1891–1899) players
Sacramento Senators players
Oakland Colonels players
Rochester Hop Bitters players
Piedmont (minor league baseball) players
San Francisco Metropolitans players
San Francisco Brewers players
Milwaukee Brewers (minor league) players
Los Angeles Angels (minor league) players
Spokane Smoke Eaters players
Petaluma (minor league baseball) players
Eugene Blues players
San Francisco Seals (baseball) players
Burlington Flint Hills players
Meridian Ribboners players